Clevenger is an unincorporated community in Clay County, in the U.S. state of Missouri.

The community most likely was named for the local Clevenger family.

References

Unincorporated communities in Clay County, Missouri
Unincorporated communities in Missouri